Michelangelo Celesia, O.S.B. Cas. (13 January 1814 – 14 April 1904) was an Italian Benedictine monk who served as the Archbishop of Palermo from 1871 until his death, and was elevated to the cardinalate in 1884.

Biography
He was born Pietro Geremia Celesia in Palermo in 1814, the son of Lancellotto Celesia, Marchese of Sant'Antonino, and Giuseppa Caruso Azzolini. As a teenager, he felt called to become a monk of the Monastery of San Martino della Scala in his native city, which belonged to the Cassinese Congregation of the Order of Saint Benedict. He was received as a candidate of the monastery in 1833 and, at admission into the novitiate, he was given the religious name of Michelangelo. He made his solemn profession on 15 January 1835 and was ordained to the priesthood on 24 July 1836.

Celesia later served in various positions at the monastery in Palermo from 1840 to 1846, such as lector of philosophy, dean, professor of dogmatic theology. He was named Abbot of the renowned Abbey of Monte Cassino, by papal decree, on 25 March 1850 and General Procurator of the congregation in 1858, as well as Abbot of Farfa Abbey.

On 23 March 1860 Celesia was appointed Bishop of Patti by Pope Pius IX, receiving his episcopal consecration on the following 15 April from Cardinal Girolamo D'Andrea. The Benedictine attended the First Vatican Council, and was later named Archbishop of Palermo on 27 October 1871.

Pope Leo XIII named him a Cardinal Priest, with his titular church that of Santa Prisca, in the consistory of 13 November 1884. Celesia opted for the titular church of San Marco on 25 November 1887. Although eligible, he was unable to participate in the papal conclave of 1903 due to ill health.

Celesia died in Palermo the following year, at the age of 90, at which time he was the oldest living cardinal. After lying in state in the Palermo Cathedral, he was buried in the church of the Capuchin friars in Palermo. His remains were transferred several years later to a side chapel of the cathedral.

References

External links
Catholic-Hierarchy 
Cardinals of the Holy Roman Church

1814 births
1904 deaths
Italian Benedictines
Benedictine abbots
Benedictine bishops
19th-century Italian Roman Catholic archbishops
20th-century Italian Roman Catholic archbishops
Roman Catholic archbishops of Palermo
Benedictine cardinals
19th-century Italian cardinals
Cardinals created by Pope Leo XIII
Burials at Palermo Cathedral
20th-century Italian cardinals
Abbots of Monte Cassino